Amgaon is a town located in Gondia district of Nagpur Division in the state of Maharashtra, India.Amgoan has total 17,897 Urban population which rank 3rd in Gondia District after Gondia and Tirora.

Location
Amgaon is a town in Gondia district, Maharashtra, and is a part of Vidarbha region. It is located 24 km east of its district headquarters at Gondia. 

Amgaon comes under Amgaon (Vidhan Sabha constituency) and Chimur (Lok Sabha constituency).

References

Cities and towns in Gondia district
Talukas in Maharashtra